Andreas Makri (born 27 August 1991) is a Cypriot sports shooter. He competed in the men's trap event at the 2020 Summer Olympics.

References

External links
 

1991 births
Living people
Cypriot male sport shooters
Olympic shooters of Cyprus
Shooters at the 2020 Summer Olympics
People from Paphos